Stozha is a village in the municipality of Sandanski in Blagoevgrad Province, south-western Bulgaria. It is situated on the south-western foothills of the Pirin mountain range along the banks of the Sandanska Bistritsa river.

References

Villages in Blagoevgrad Province